The 1988 Melbourne Cup was a two-mile handicap horse race which took place on Tuesday, 1 November 1988.

The race was won by Empire Rose, the popular New Zealand mare who had finished fifth in 1986 when trained by Bart Cummings and second to Kensei the previous year. She did one better in 1988 after winning Mackinnon Stakes she held off 5/1 equal favourite (Empire Rose was also 5/1) Metropolitan Handicap winner Natski in the "Bicentenary" Melbourne Cup Empire Rose became the first mare to win the race since 1965. Empire Rose had previously placed second to Royal Heights in the 1986 New Zealand Oaks and won the 1987 New Zealand Cup.  She subsequently placed third in the 1989 W. S. Cox Plate. This would be the last of four Melbourne Cup calls by Bruce McAvaney though his call of this race is considered to be among the best in the race's history.

Field 

This is a list of horses which ran in the 1988 Melbourne Cup.

References

1988
Melbourne Cup
Melbourne Cup
1980s in Melbourne